FVV may refer to:

Groups and organizations
 FVV
 FVV (Budapest), trambus operator, predecessor to Budapesti Közlekedési Zrt.
 Frankfurter Verkehrsverbund, predecessor to Frankfurt U-Bahn

Vehicles
 FVV (armoured car fighting vehicle), see List of armored fighting vehicles of the Soviet Union
 Facilities Verification Vehicle
 an Apollo module used in the Saturn IB display
 a Saturn V rocket used for SA-500F
 FV-V, a series of tractors from Farmall France

Other uses
 Fred VanVleet (born 1994), U.S. basketball player

See also

 FV (disambiguation)
 FW (disambiguation)

 FV2 (disambiguation)